Hemigenia scabra is an open, sprawling shrub with white flowers, hairy stems and foliage and is endemic to Western Australia.

Description
Both stems and foliage have rough to smooth soft hairs or short coarse hairs. Flowering occurs from August to October.

Taxonomy and naming
The species was first formally described in 1870 by George Bentham and the description was published in Flora Australiensis. The specific epithet (scabra) is derived from the Latin scaber meaning "rough", referring to the leaves and stems.

Distribution and habitat
Hemigenia scabra is found growing in  the Avon wheatbelt, Geraldton and the Shire of Yalgoo on and near sandplains in gravelly white or yellow sands.

References

scabra
Lamiales of Australia
Endemic flora of Australia
Flora of Western Australia
Taxa named by George Bentham
Plants described in 1870